The Basilica of Sant'Antonino is a medieval Roman Catholic basilica in the city of Piacenza in Italy. it is dedicated to the patron saint of the city, Antoninus.

The original church of Sant'Antonio was an early Christian martyrium. The present building was the work of Bishop Sigifredo, who dedicated it in 1014 as a collegiate church. He chose the form of a oriented basilica with a western nave and a campanile. The interior was decorated with early Romanesque painting, a little of which survives.

The basilica on pilgrimage routes was designed by Pietro Vago in 1350. In 1998, a large statue of Gregory X, sculpted by Giorgio Groppi, was placed under the large Portico of Paradise. The Portico was itself completed in the 12th century with carvings by the school of Niccolò da Ferrara. The church has been rebuilt and modified across the century. The carved wood ceiling was substituted by Gothic tracery. In the 19th century pseudo-gothic decoration was added to the interior. The adjacent cloister dates to 1483.

The interior of the church contains frescoes by Camillo Gavasetti in the presbytery, and canvases by Robert de Longe. Many of the works have been transferred to the Civic Gallery. Among the works retained is a "Coronation of the Virgin" by Gian Battista Trotti (il Malosso).

References

Roman Catholic churches in Piacenza
14th-century Roman Catholic church buildings in Italy
Gothic architecture in Emilia-Romagna
Romanesque architecture in Piacenza
Basilica churches in Emilia-Romagna